The Federation of Islamic Associations of New Zealand (FIANZ) was set up in April 1979 by Mazhar Krasniqi and other Muslim community leaders to draw together the regional Islam organisations of Auckland, Wellington and Canterbury into one centralised New Zealand-wide body.

History

Origins
Following the creation of the Muslim Association of Canterbury, local Muslims in Christchurch initiated correspondence with other Muslim organisations in Auckland and Wellington, with an eye towards creating a national Muslim organisation and helping to develop the Halal meat trade. On 18 November 1978 the first preparatory meeting was held in Christchurch : Hajji Abbas Ali and Robert "Abdul Salam" Drake (architect of the Ponsonby mosque) came representing Auckland; whilst Hajji Salamat Khan, Dr Hajji Khalid Rashid Sandhu and Abdul Rahman Khan came from Wellington ; Palmerston North was represented by Ali Taal, a postgraduate student from Gambia. Following two meetings in Palmerston North on 6 February 1979 and Auckland on 15 April 1989, a consensus was reached and the Federation of Islamic Associations of New Zealand (FIANZ) was formally established. Auckland resident Mazhar Krasniqi (an Albanian SS Goya refugee from Kosovo) was the inaugural president, Dr Hajji Hanif Quazi was the first Secretary-General, and Haji Hussain Sahib was made the first FIANZ treasurer.

1980s
In 1981, Sheikh Khalid Hafiz was appointed Imam of Wellington, a post he held until his death in 1999, and employed as such by the International Muslim Association of New Zealand. Soon after his arrival, he was appointed senior religious adviser to the Federation of Islamic Associations of New Zealand.

In June 1984, the Federation signed the first annual contract with the New Zealand Meat Producers Board (later the Meat Industry Association) to provide Halal certification services in exchange for a remuneration. The first contract was for $169,000 in 1984. Currently the figure is over one million dollars and helps subsidise much of the Islamic activities across New Zealand.

In April 1988, FIANZ held its first ever South Island AGM at the Canterbury mosque and Christchurch resident Dr Saleh Al Samahy from Saudi Arabia was elected president. A second South Island AGM was held at the mosque (in Riccarton) over 24–25 June 1989 where Dr Sandhu of Wellington was elected president and Dr Al Samahy was made vice-president. The following year a local convert to Islam, Soraiya Gilmour, was appointed FIANZ Treasurer.

Into the 21st century
In November 2005, the Federation celebrated its 25th anniversary (a year late) and Eid al Fitr in Parliament House, Wellington. The event was attended by the then FIANZ president Muhammed Javed (Zaved) Iqbal Khan (originally from Fiji), the inaugural president Mazhar Krasniqi, and a former president Dr Hajji Muhammed Ashraf Choudhary.

In June 2008, the "FIANZ First Stakeholders Forum" was organised by New Zealand government civil servants at the parliament in Wellington. The theme was "To Build Strong New Zealand Muslim Families" but only a few Muslims were actually invited. Ultimately the only respected and interesting speaker was the Nigerian Dr Mustapha Farouk from Hamilton (whose name remains consistently misspelt in the FIANZ website). The following year, FIANZ organised the "FIANZ National Muslim Convention" over 24–25 October 2009 in Auckland and the theme was "Building Strong Muslim Families". This was attended by approximately 300 local Muslims. The most important speaker was Dr Mustapha Farouk and FIANZ Assistant Secretary Brent "Abdul Lateef" Smith (a Major in the New Zealand army).

In response to the Canadian alt-right activists Lauren Southern and Stefan Molyneux's planned tour of Auckland in early August 2018, the FIANZ's president Hazim Arafeh sent letters to the Immigration Minister, Ethnic Community Affairs Minister, and the New Zealand Human Rights Commission urging them to bar Southern entry on the grounds that she was abusing her free speech by promoting hatred against Muslims. On 6 July 2018, the Mayor of Auckland Phil Goff announced that the Auckland Council would not allows its venues to be used to promote "ethnic or religious tensions" and divisive speech. This forced the cancellation of Southern and Molyneux's tour due to the lack of other venues.

Former FIANZ presidents

 15 April 1979 – Hajji Mazhar Krasniqi, Q.S.M.
 15 September 1979 – Hajji Abdul Rahim Rasheed, Q.S.O.
 6 April 1980 – Rahim Ghouri
 18 April 1981 – Hajji Abdul Rahim Rasheed, Q.S.O.
 10 April 1982 – Hajji Abdul Rahim Rasheed, Q.S.O.
 2 April 1983 – Mohammad Hanif Quazi
 23 April 1984 – Hajji Muhammed Ashraf Choudhary, Q.S.O.
 14 April 1985 – Hajji Muhammed Ashraf Choudhary, Q.S.O.
 10–11 May 1986 – Hajji Khalid Rashid Sandhu, Q.S.O.
 2 May 1987 –  Hajji Khalid Rashid Sandhu, Q.S.O.
 21–22 May 1988 – Hajji Saleh Al Samahy
 24–25 June 1989 – Hajji Khalid Rashid Sandhu, Q.S.O.
 8–9 September 1990 – Abdur Rahman Khan
 1991 – Muhammed Azim Khan
 30–31 May 1992 – Hajji Abdul Hafeez Rasheed
 19–20 June 1993 – Imam Ali
 6–7 July 1996 – Imam Ali
 13–14 June 1997 – Hajji Anwar-ul Ghani
 12–13 June 1999 –  Hajji Anwar-ul Ghani
 26–27 May 2001 – Hajji Anwar-ul Ghani
 28–29 June 2003 – Muhammed Javed (Zaved) Iqbal Khan
 18 July 2009 – Hajji Anwar-ul Ghani
 26–27 May 2015 – Hazim Arafeh
 
 NB. Over the past 25 years the FIANZ constitution has been amended on several occasions. Some presidents served terms of one year whilst others served two. To simply the information here, the dates and names presented are confirmed Annual General Meetings AND elections. Strictly speaking the elections are supposed to be held every "second quarter".

Current executive committee

The current (20 July 2021) Executive Committee includes:

President – Ibrar Sheikh 

Vice-President – Mohammed Ridwan 

Secretary – Abdirizak Abdi

Treasurer – Mohammed Fazal

Assistant Secretary – Riaz Rehman

FIANZ Head Office: 

Chief Executive Officer – Sultan Eusoff

FIANZ Community Development Headquarters:

Senior Community Development Executive - Rito Triumbarto

Community Development Liaison Officer - George Shafi Lethbridge

Issues
Over the past thirty years, with growing numbers of Muslims in New Zealand, there have been a number of complaints directed at the Federation. The most serious issue centres around whether FIANZ is primarily a religious minority organisation or an ethnic minority cultural one: it has been suggested that the Federation conducts its affairs more like those found within the Developing Nations rather than a New Zealand organisation. As early as 1983 one Arab Muslim resident in Wellington dismissed FIANZ as "a group of Fijian labourers". More recently FIANZ leadership was tagged "..as a conservative businessmen's club of relaxed Muslims, well integrated in New Zealand society and benignly sexist."

Other lingering criticisms reflect cultural matters. Despite a concern with the "public" appearance of following the Sunnah, the Federation has sometimes created the impression of acting as a personal vehicle for certain office bearers. On occasion highly subjective evaluations appear to have decided some issues rather than any discernable long term goals. Questions have been raised in the past regarding appointments to posts within the Federation apparatus.

There have also been criticisms directed at the close relationship between certain Federation leaders and the New Zealand Labour Party after it was disclosed that FIANZ had contributed over $10,000 to their failed 2008 election campaign.

Further reading
 Berryman, Warren, and Draper, John, "Meat exporters resist costly Islamic crusade" in The National Business Review (May 1979), Volume 9, No.16 (Issue 333), p. 1.
 Bishop, Martin C., ` "A History of the Muslim Community in New Zealand to 1980", thesis submitted in partial fulfilment of the requirement for the degree of M.A. in history at the University of Waikato’ (Waikato University, 1997).
 "Growing Support For Queen St Protest March" in The Auckland Star (26 August 1968), p. 3.
 "3000 stage city protest" in The Auckland Star (28 August 1968), p. 1.
 Clarke, Ian, "ESSENTIALISING ISLAM: MULTICULTURALISM AND ISLAMIC POLITICS IN NEW ZEALAND" in New Zealand Journal of Asian Studies 8, 2 (December 2006) pages. 69–96.
 “City Mosque For Muslims” in The New Zealand Herald (28 March 1979), p. 1.
 Berryman, Warren, "Insensitivities created halal meat difficulties" in The National Business Review (19 December 1983), page.13.
 De Graaf, Peter, "The Kiwi Kosovars" in Metro (June 2001), pp. 89–93.
 Drury, Abdullah, "A Short History of the Ponsonby Mosque, New Zealand" in Al-Nahdah (Malaysia), Vol.19, No.3, pp. 36–38.
 Drury, Abdullah, "A Short History: New Zealand’s First Mosque” in The Muslim World League Journal (Dhul-Qa‘adah 1421 – February 2001), Vol.28, No.11, pp. 45–48.
 Drury, Abdullah, "A Short History of the Ponsonby Mosque, Auckland" in Da’wah Highlights (Rabi-ul Awwal 1422 – June 2001), Vol.XII, Issue 6, pp. 43–50.
 Drury, Abdullah, "A Tribute to the Illyrian Pioneers" in Al Mujaddid (March 2002 – Muharram 1423), Vol.1, No.16, p. 10.
 Drury, Abdullah, Islam in New Zealand: The First Mosque (Christchurch, 2007) 
 Drury, Abdullah, "Islamic federation milestone a good time for soul-searching" in The New Zealand Herald (24 August 2009).
 Drury, Abdullah, "Mazhar Krasniqi Now QSM" in Al Mujaddid (20 March 2003 – Muharram 1424), p. 16.
 Drury, Abdullah, "Mazharbeg" in Al Mujaddid (21 June 2003 – Rabiul Thani 1424), Vol.1, p. 14.
 Drury, Abdullah "Once Were Mahometans: Muslims in the South Island of New Zealand, mid-19th to late 20th century, with special reference to Canterbury" (University of Waikato, MPhil, 2016), Hamilton. 
 Drury, Abdullah "Mahometans on the Edge of Colonial Empire: Antipodean Experiences" in Islam and Christian–Muslim Relations, Volume 29, Issue 1, pp. 71-87.
 “Eastern Dome For Skyline” in The New Zealand Herald (7 April 1980), p. 2.
 
 "Islamic Meat Trade" in The Otago Daily Times (12 March 1979), p. 1.
 Kolig, Erich, New Zealand's Muslims and Multiculturalism (2010) .
 Krasniqi, Mazhar, "Message" in Al Mujaddid (January 2000), p. 4.
 MacIntyre, Dave, "$3m Being Sent To NZ For Building of Two Mosques" in The Evening Post (29 November 1978), p. 44.
 Mannion, Robert, "Moslems Caught in Classic Dilemma" in The Dominion Sunday Times (26 February 1989), p. 11.
 Middleton, Julie, "NZ Muslim leader honoured" in The New Zealand Herald (22 August 2005), p. 10.
 "Mohammad Sharif Madhavi Hojatol Islam spends most of his time supervising halal killing in freezing works." in The Auckland Star (14 April 1980), p. 7.
 Moore, Leanne, "Muslims and Catholics in single salute" in The New Zealand Herald (30 September 1995), p. 24.
 "Moslem Group Form NZ Federation" in The New Zealand Herald (2 May 1979), p. 10.
 "Muslims begin the holy month of Ramadan" in The New Zealand Herald (27 January 1996), p. 17.
 "Muslims plan mosque for city" in The Auckland Star (4 January 1956), p. 5.
 "Muslims Raising Funds for a Mosque" in The New Zealand Herald (4 January 1956), p. 8.
 "Muslims Raising Meat Deal Snags" in The Evening Post (4 August 1979), p. 8.
 "Musovich" in The New Zealand Herald (17–18 November 2001), D13.
 "N.Z. Moslems Support Arab Cause" in The New Zealand Herald (12 June 1967), p. 1.
 "Obituary Notice" in Al Mujaddid (December 2001 – Shawaal 1422), Vol.1, No.15, p. 9.
 "Obituary" in RISEAP Newsletter (December 2001), p. 4.
 Sheppard, William, "The Muslim Community in New Zealand", Chapter 5 in Indians in New Zealand, ed. K.N. Tiwari (Wellington, N.Z.: Price-Milburn, 1980). [Purely historical interest; has no content that is not found in other articles.]
 
 Sheppard, William,  "The Islamic Contribution: Muslims in New Zealand", in Religion in New Zealand Society, Second Edition, eds Brian Colless & Peter Donovan (Palmerston North, New Zealand: Dunmore Press, 1985), pp. 181–213.
 Sheppard, William,  "Muslims in New Zealand", The Journal of the Institute of Muslim Minority Affairs (Riyadh), 16/2 (1996): 211–232.  [Updates 1982 article to 1991.]
 Sheppard, William,  "Australia and New Zealand", authored jointly with Michael Humphrey, in Islam Outside the Arab World, eds. David Westerlund and Ingvar Svanberg, Surrey: Curzon Press, 1999, pp. 278–294.
 Sheppard, William,  "Muslims in New Zealand" in Muslim Minorities in the West: Visible and Invisible, eds., Yvonne Y. Haddad and Jane I. Smith, Walnut Creek, etc.: Altamira Press, 2002, chapter 13.
 Sheppard, William,  “New Zealand’s Muslims And Their Organisations” New Zealand Journal of Asian Studies 8, 2 (December 2006): 8–44. (cf. “Introduction: Muslims In New Zealand” in the next section)
 Sheppard, William,  “Introduction: Muslims In New Zealand”, New Zealand Journal of Asian Studies 8, 2 (December 2006): 1–7. Co-authored with Erich Kolig.
 Sheppard, William,  "Australia and New Zealand", in The Oxford Encyclopaedia of the Modern Islamic World  (New York and Oxford: Oxford University Press, 1995), Vol. 1, pp. 154–5.
 Thomson, Ainsley, “Mazhar Krasniqi” in The New Zealand Herald (31 December 2002), p.A6.
 Trickett, Peter, "Minarets in Ponsonby" in The New Zealand Listener (21 April 1979), pp. 18–19.
 Waja, Ismail, "50 Years Celebrations" in Al Mujaddid (July 2001), pp. 1–2, 7.
 New Zealand Gazette (10 January 2003), Issue No.2., p. 83.
 Zaman, Gul, "In Memory of Marhum Demal Hodzic" in FIANZ News (March 2006), p. 7.

References 

Islamic organisations based in New Zealand
1979 establishments in New Zealand
Islamic organizations established in 1979
Organisations based in Wellington